Highway to Hell is the fifth studio album by Australian hard rock band AC/DC, released on 27 July 1979. It was the last album featuring lead singer Bon Scott, who would die early the following year on 19 February 1980.

Background
By 1978, AC/DC had released five albums internationally and had toured Australia and Europe extensively. In 1977, they landed in America and, with virtually no radio support, began to amass a live following. The band's most recent album, the live If You Want Blood, had reached number 13 in the United Kingdom, and the two albums previous to that, 1977's Let There Be Rock and 1978's Powerage, had seen the band find their raging, blues-based hard rock sound. Although the American branch of Atlantic Records had rejected the group's 1976 LP Dirty Deeds Done Dirt Cheap, it now believed the band was poised to strike it big in the States if only they would work with a producer who could give them a radio-friendly sound. Since their 1975 Australian debut High Voltage, all of AC/DC's albums had been produced by George Young and Harry Vanda. According to the book AC/DC: Maximum Rock & Roll, the band was not enthusiastic about the idea, especially guitarists Angus Young and Malcolm Young, who felt a strong sense of loyalty to their older brother George:

The producer Atlantic paired the band with was South African-born Eddie Kramer, best known for his pioneering work as engineer for Jimi Hendrix but also for mega-bands Led Zeppelin and Kiss. Kramer met the band at Criteria Studios in Miami, Florida but, by all accounts, they did not get on. Geoff Barton quotes Malcolm Young in Guitar Legends magazine: "Kramer was a bit of a prat. He looked at Bon and said to us, 'Can your guy sing?' He might've sat behind the knobs for Hendrix, but he's certainly not Hendrix, I can tell you that much." Former AC/DC manager Michael Browning recalls in the 1994 book Highway to Hell: The Life and Times of AC/DC Legend Bon Scott, "I got a phone call from Malcolm in Florida, to say, 'This guy's hopeless, do something, he's trying to talk us into recording that Spencer Davis song,' 'Gimme Some Lovin',' 'I'm a Man,' whatever it was." Browning turned to Zambian-born producer Robert John "Mutt" Lange to step in. Lange was best known for producing the Boomtown Rats number-one hit "Rat Trap" and post-pub rock bands like Clover, City Boy, and Graham Parker. In 1979, singer Bon Scott told RAM magazine, "Three weeks in Miami and we hadn't written a thing with Kramer. So one day we told him we were going to have a day off and not to bother coming in. This was Saturday, and we snuck into the studio and on that one day we put down six songs, sent the tape to Lange and said, 'Will you work with us?'" The band had also signed up with new management, firing Michael Browning and hiring Peter Mensch, an aggressive American who had helped develop the careers of Aerosmith and Ted Nugent.

Recording
Recording commenced at the Roundhouse Recording Studios in Chalk Farm, north London in March 1979. In his book Highway to Hell, Clinton Walker writes, "The band virtually moved into the Roundhouse Studios in Chalk Farm, spending the best part of three months there. That, to start with, was a shock to AC/DC, who had never previously spent more than three weeks on any one album... Sessions for the album—15 hours a day, day-in day-out, for over two months—were gruelling. Songs were worked and reworked." Lange's no-nonsense approach was appreciated by the band, whose own work ethic had always been solid. In an article by Mojos Sylvie Simmons, Malcolm Young stated that Lange "liked the simplicity of a band. We were all minimalist. We felt it was the best way to be... He knew we were all dedicated so he sort of got it. But he made sure the tracks were solid, and he could hear if a snare just went off." In the same article Angus Young added, "He was meticulous about sound, getting right guitars and drums. He would zero in—and he was good too on the vocal side. Even Bon was impressed with how he could get his voice to sound." Tour manager, Ian Jeffery, who was present during recordings recalled:

In AC/DC: Maximum Rock & Roll, Arnaud Durieux writes that Lange, a trained singer, showed Scott how to breathe so he could be a technically better singer on songs like "Touch Too Much" and would join in on background vocals himself, having to stand on the other side of the studio because his own voice was so distinctive. The melodic backing vocals were a new element to the band's sound, but the polish Lange added did not detract from the band's characteristic crunch, thereby satisfying both the band and Atlantic Records at the same time.

Lange also taught Angus some useful lessons, instructing him to play his solos while sitting next to the producer. Jeffrey recalled: "Mutt said: 'Sit here and I'll tell you what I want you to play.' Angus was like, 'You fucking will, will ya?' But he sat next to Mutt and Mutt didn't force it on him, just kind of pointed at the fretboard and, 'Here, this...' and 'Hold that...' and 'Now go into that...' It was the solo from "Highway To Hell". It was fantastic! And that really stood them all to attention on Mutt too. He wasn’t asking them to do anything he couldn’t do himself, or getting on their case saying it’s been wrong in the past; nothing like that. He really massaged them into what became that album."

Composition
The album's most famous song is the title track. From the outset, Atlantic Records hated the idea of using the song as the album title, with Angus later telling Guitar Worlds Alan Di Perna:

In a 2003 interview with Bill Crandall of Rolling Stone, Angus recalled the genesis of the song:

 
The words to "Highway to Hell" took on a new resonance when Scott drank himself to death in 1980. AllMusic's Steve Huey observed:

 
Scott's lyrics on Highway to Hell deal almost exclusively with lust ("Love Hungry Man", "Girls Got Rhythm"), sex ("Beating Around the Bush", "Touch Too Much", "Walk All Over You"), and partying on the town ("Get It Hot", "Shot Down in Flames").  In his 2006 band memoir, Murray Engelheart reveals that Scott felt the lyrics of songs like "Gone Shootin'" from the preceding Powerage were "simply too serious."

"Touch Too Much" had been first recorded in July 1977, with a radically different arrangement and lyrics from its Highway to Hell incarnation. The final version was performed by Scott and AC/DC on the BBC music show Top of the Pops a few days before the singer's death in 1980. The song "If You Want Blood (You've Got It)" borrowed the title of the band's live album from the previous year and stemmed from Scott's response to a journalist at the Day on the Green festival in July 1978: when asked what they could expect from the band, Scott replied, "Blood".

The opening guitar riff of "Beating Around the Bush" has been referred to by journalist Phil Sutcliffe as "almost a tribute... a reflection, I hesitate to say a copy" of "Oh Well" by Fleetwood Mac.Archived at Ghostarchive and the Wayback Machine: 

Asked in 1998, "What's the worst record you've ever made?", Angus replied: "There's a song on Highway to Hell called 'Love Hungry Man' which I must have written after a night of bad pizza – you can blame me for that."

Perhaps the album's most infamous song is "Night Prowler", mainly due to its association with serial killer Richard Ramírez. In June 1985, a highly publicised murder case began revolving around Ramirez, who was responsible for more than 15 brutal murders, as well as numerous rapes and attempted murders, in Los Angeles. Nicknamed the "Night Stalker", Ramírez was a fan of AC/DC, particularly "Night Prowler", and police claimed he left an AC/DC hat at one of the crime scenes. During the trial, Ramírez shouted "Hail Satan" and showed off a pentagram carved into his palm with the numbers 666 below it. This brought extremely bad publicity to AC/DC, whose concerts and albums faced protests by parents in Los Angeles. On the episode of VH1's Behind the Music about AC/DC, the band maintained that the song had been given a murderous connotation by Ramírez, but is actually about a boy sneaking into his girlfriend's bedroom at night while her parents are asleep, in spite of lyrics such as, "And you don't feel the steel, till it's hanging out your back". The final words spoken by Scott in the song, and therefore on the album, are "Shazbot, na-nu na-nu", phrases spoken by lead character Mork (a visiting extraterrestrial played by Robin Williams) on the popular American sitcom Mork and Mindy.

Releases
Highway to Hell was originally released on 27 July 1979 by Albert Productions, who licensed the album to Atlantic Records for release outside of Australia, and it was re-released by Epic Records in 2003 as part of the AC/DC Remasters series. In Australia, the album was originally released with a slightly different album cover, featuring flames and a drawing of a bass guitar neck superimposed over the same photo of the band used on the international cover; also, the AC/DC logo is a darker shade of maroon, but the accents are a bit lighter. The East German release had different and much plainer designs for the front and back of the album, apparently because the authorities were not happy with the sleeve as released elsewhere.

"Highway to Hell" is featured in the 2003 film Final Destination 2 and the 2010 film Percy Jackson & the Olympians: The Lightning Thief. "If You Want Blood (You've Got It)" is featured in the films Empire Records (1995), The Longest Yard (2005), The Dukes of Hazzard (2005), Shoot 'Em Up (2007), and Final Destination 5 (2011). "Walk All Over You" is featured in the 2010 film Grown Ups. "Touch Too Much" is featured on the soundtrack for the video game Grand Theft Auto IV: The Lost and Damned, and it was also the theme song for the World Wrestling Federation's SummerSlam event in 1998.

Reception

The album became AC/DC's first LP to break the top 100 of the US Billboard 200 chart, eventually reaching number 17, and it propelled the band into the top ranks of hard rock acts.  It is the second-highest selling AC/DC album (behind Back in Black) and is generally considered one of the greatest hard rock albums ever made. On 25 May 2006, the album was certified 7× Platinum by the RIAA.

Of the album, Greg Kot of Rolling Stone wrote: "The songs are more compact, the choruses fattened by rugby-team harmonies. The prize moment: Scott closes the hip-grinding 'Shot Down in Flames' with a cackle worthy of the Wicked Witch of the West." In a 2008 Rolling Stone cover story, David Fricke noted: "Superproducer 'Mutt' Lange sculpted AC/DC's rough-granite rock into chart-smart boogie on this album." AllMusic called the song "Highway to Hell" "one of hard rock's all-time anthems." The album was ranked number 199 on Rolling Stone magazine's 2003 list of the 500 greatest albums of all time; it was number 200 on the 2012 revised list. The 2010 book The 100 Best Australian Albums included Highway to Hell in the top 50 (Back in Black was No. 2).

In 2013, AC/DC fans Steevi Diamond and Jon Morter (who was behind a Rage Against the Machine Facebook campaign in 2009) spearheaded a Facebook campaign to make "Highway to Hell" a Christmas number one single on the UK Singles Chart, to celebrate the 40th anniversary of AC/DC, and to prevent The X Factor from achieving another number one hit single. The campaign raised funds for Feel Yourself, a testicular cancer-awareness charity. The song peaked at number four on the Official Singles Chart for Christmas that year, making it AC/DC's first-ever UK Top 10 single.

Track listing

PersonnelAC/DCBon Scott – lead vocals
Angus Young – lead guitar
Malcolm Young – rhythm guitar, backing vocals
Cliff Williams – bass, backing vocals
Phil Rudd – drumsTechnical personnel'
Producer: Robert John "Mutt" Lange
Recording Studio: Roundhouse Recording Studios, London, England
Recording Engineer: Mark Dearnley
Mixing Studio: Basing Street Studios, London, England
Mixing Engineer: Tony Platt
Assistant Engineer: Kevin Dallimore
Art Direction: Bob Defrin
Photography: Jim Houghton

Charts

Weekly charts

Year-end charts

Certifications

References

External links
 Lyrics on AC/DC's official website
 
 Highway to Hell by Joe Bonomo in the 33 1/3 Series of books

AC/DC albums
Albert Productions albums
1979 albums
Atlantic Records albums
Albums produced by Robert John "Mutt" Lange